"Coming Up Roses" is the second single from the third studio album Come Clean by alternative rock band Curve. It was released on 4 May 1998 and it reached #51 in the UK singles chart.

The Kevin Shields mix of this song was included on the disc 2 of Curve's compilation The Way of Curve.

Track listing

CD 1
"Coming Up Roses" (Jeremy Wheatley's Radio mix) – 3:51	
"Coming Up Roses" (Talvin Singh remix) – 8:09
"Midnight & Royal" – 4:45
"Habit" – 4:12

CD 2
"Coming Up Roses" (Jeremy Wheatley's Full mix) – 4:00
"Coming Up Roses" (Blue Amazon's Crystaline Vocal mix) – 6:01
"Coming Up Roses" (Red Star Yellow Star mix) – 9:06
"Coming Up Roses" (Danny Saber Full Length mix) – 5:21
"Coming Up Roses" (Kevin Shields mix) – 6:20

12"
"Coming Up Roses" (Blue Amazon's Crystaline Vocal mix) – 6:01
"Coming Up Roses" (Blue Amazon's Quad Club mix) – 10:45
"Coming Up Roses" (Jeremy Wheatley's Full mix) – 4:00
"Coming Up Roses" (Talvin Singh remix) – 8:09

Credits
 Written by Toni Halliday and Dean Garcia
 Produced by Steve Osborne and Curve, engineered and mixed by Alan Moulder (except "Midnight & Royal" and "Habit" produced and mixed by Curve at Todal)

References

1998 singles
Curve (band) songs
1998 songs
Songs written by Dean Garcia
Songs written by Toni Halliday